Elections were held in the state of Western Australia on 12 March 1921 to elect all 50 members to the Legislative Assembly. The incumbent government, led by Premier James Mitchell of the Nationalist Party and supported by the Country Party and National Labor Party, won a second term in government against the Labor Party opposition, led by Opposition Leader Philip Collier.

At this election Edith Cowan became the first woman elected to any Australian parliament.

Results 

|}

 164,688 electors were enrolled to vote at the election, but 6 of the 50 seats were uncontested, with 17,740 electors enrolled in those seats. Of these, 3 were held by Labor, 2 by the Country Party and 1 was held by the National Labor Party.

See also
 Members of the Western Australian Legislative Assembly, 1917–1921
 Members of the Western Australian Legislative Assembly, 1921–1924
 First Mitchell Ministry

References

Elections in Western Australia
1921 elections in Australia
1920s in Western Australia
March 1921 events